Heart Full of Fire is the second full-length album from the Finnish hard rock band Brother Firetribe. It was released by Spinefarm Records in 2008. It was produced and co-engineered by Vuorinen with the whole group having written all the songs except for "Chasing the Angels" which was written by John Lewis Parker (originally written for Mike Reno of Loverboy).

allmusic's Eduardo Rivadavia gave the album 3.5 stars out of 5, calling it "A throwback in every sense of the word."  He went on to say that "The album's 11 tracks pulse with the same familiar combination of catchy choruses, muscular guitar riffs, anthemic synthesizer melodies, and sparkling clean production values that original genre purveyors like Journey, REO Speedwagon, and Foreigner (to name but a few) ruled the airwaves with in the early '80s, but which haven't really dented the American charts since Giant's early-'90s attempts."

The song "I Am Rock" was originally recorded for a Finnish TV series called "Pelkkää lihaa".

Track listing
All songs written by Brother Firetribe, except where noted.
Who Will You Run To Now? 4:30
Wildest Dreams 3:57
Runaways 3:57
Game They Call Love 3:45
Play It From The Heart 4:21
Heart Full Of Fire 4:10
Heard It On My Radio 3:23
Going Out With A Bang 3:57
Out Of My Head 4:18
Chasing The Angels 4:13 (John Lewis Parker)
I Am Rock 3:44

Personnel
Pekka Ansio Heino: Lead Vocals
Emppu Vuorinen: Electric & Acoustic Guitars
Tomppa Nikulainen: Keyboards, Synthesizers
Jason Flinck: Bass, Backing Vocals
Kalle Torniainen: Drums, Percussion

Additional personnel
Anette Olzon: Vocals on "Heart Full Of Fire"
Sammy Salminen, Juice Wahlsten and Sanuel Hjelt: Vocals on 'I Am Rock'
Timo Silvast: Additional keyboards

Production
Arranged by Brother Firetribe
Produced by Tomppa Nikulainen & Emppu Vuorinen
Recorded by Tomppa Nikulainen & Emppu Vuorinen at Nitro/Legendary E-Major Studios
Drums Recorded by Tero Kinnunen, at Sonic Pump Studios/Legendary E-Major Studios
Mixed by Torsti Spoof & Jesse Vainio at Studio Audio except 'I Am Rock' mixed by Jesse Vainio at Sonic Pump Studios
Mastered by Svante Forsback at Chartmakers
Artwork and design by Hugh Gilmour
Photography by Carda/Metalphotos
Additional photo retouching by Janne Peltonen

External links
"Heart Full Of Fire" at discogs
[ "Heart Full Of Fire" at allmusic]

2008 albums
Brother Firetribe albums
Spinefarm Records albums